The 1972–73 DFB-Pokal was the 30th season of the annual German football cup competition. It began on 10 December 1972 and ended on 23 June 1973. 32 teams competed in the tournament of five rounds. As in the year before, the knock-out rounds were played over two legs, but the final was decided in a single game. In the memorable cup final, Borussia Mönchengladbach defeated 1. FC Köln 2–1 after extra time, with Günter Netzer substituting himself in before scoring the winning goal for Borussia.

Matches

First round

Round of 16

Quarter-finals

Semi-finals

Final

References

External links
 Official site of the DFB 
 Kicker.de 
 1972–73 results at Fussballdaten.de 
 1972–73 results at Weltfussball.de 

1972-73
1972–73 in German football cups